Hartmanice is a municipality and village in Svitavy District in the Pardubice Region of the Czech Republic. It has about 300 inhabitants.

History
The first written mention of Hartmanice is from 1437, in a donation deed of Emperor Sigismund.

Sights
The Chapel of Saint John of Nepomuk on the hill above the village was built in the early 18th century.

References

External links

 

Villages in Svitavy District